Honorato Hernández (born 29 June 1956) is a Spanish long-distance runner. He competed in the men's marathon at the 1988 Summer Olympics.

References

1956 births
Living people
Athletes (track and field) at the 1988 Summer Olympics
Spanish male long-distance runners
Spanish male marathon runners
Olympic athletes of Spain
Place of birth missing (living people)
Mediterranean Games bronze medalists for Spain
Mediterranean Games medalists in athletics
Athletes (track and field) at the 1983 Mediterranean Games